Abū al-ʿAbbās ʿAbd Allāh ibn Muḥammad al-Saffāḥ (‎; 721/722 – 8 June 754, al-Anbar) usually known as as-Saffāḥ, was the first caliph of the Abbasid Caliphate, one of the longest and most important caliphates in Islamic history.

His  as-Saffāḥ means "the Blood-Shedder". It may refer to his ruthless tactics, or perhaps it was used to instill fear in his enemies.

Family origins and earlier history
As-Saffāḥ, born in Humeima (modern-day Jordan), was head of one branch of the Banu Hāshim from Arabia, a subclan of the Quraysh tribe who traced its lineage to Hāshim, a great-grandfather of Muhammad via 'Abbās, an uncle of Muhammad, hence the title "Abbasid" for his descendants' caliphate. This indirect link to Muhammad's larger clan formed sufficient basis for as-Saffah's claim to the title caliph.

As-Saffah was the son of Muhammad ibn Ali and his mother was named Rayta was the daughter of a certain Ubayd Allah ibn Abd Allah.

As narrated in many hadith, many believed that in the end times a great leader or mahdi would appear from the family of Muhammad, to which Ali belonged, who would deliver Islam from corrupt leadership. The half-hearted policies of the late Umayyads to tolerate non-Arab Muslims and Shi'as had failed to quell unrest among these minorities.

During the reign of late Umayyad Caliph Hisham ibn Abd al-Malik this unrest led to a revolt in Kufa in southern Iraq, mainly by the town's slaves. Shi'ites revolted in 736 and held the city until 740, led by Zayd ibn Ali, a grandson of Husayn and another member of the Banu Hashim. Zayd's rebellion was put down by Umayyad armies in 740. The revolt in Kufa indicated both the strength of the Umayyads and the growing unrest in the Muslim world.

During the last days of the Umayyad caliphate, Abu al-‘Abbās and his clan chose to begin their rebellion in Khurasān, an important, but remote military region comprising eastern Iran, southern parts of the modern Central Asian republics of Turkmenistan, Uzbekistan, Tajikistan, Kyrgyzstan and northern Afghanistan. In 743, the death of the Umayyad Caliph Hishām provoked a rebellion in the east. Abu al-`Abbās, supported by Shi'as and the residents of Khurasān, led his forces to victory over the Umayyads. The civil war was marked by millennial prophecies encouraged by the beliefs of some Shi'as that as-Saffāḥ was the mahdi. In Shi'ite works such as the al-Jafr faithful Muslims were told that the brutal civil war was the great conflict between good and evil. The choice of the Umayyads to enter battle with white flags and the Abbasids to enter with black encouraged such theories. The color white, however, was regarded in much of Persia as a sign of mourning.

Family tree
Abbasid Caliphate was founded by a dynasty descended from Muhammad's uncle, Abbas ibn Abdul-Muttalib (566–653 CE), from whom the dynasty takes its name.

Caliphate
In early October 749 (132 AH), Abu al-'Abbās as-Saffāh's rebel army entered Kufa, a major Muslim center in Southern Iraq. As-Saffah had not been yet declared caliph. One of his priorities was to eliminate his Umayyad rival, caliph Marwan II. The latter was defeated in February 750 at a battle on the (Great) Zab river north of Baghdad, effectively ending the Umayyad caliphate, which had ruled since 661 AD. Marwan II fled back to Damascus, which didn't welcome him, and was ultimately killed on the run in Egypt that August.
As-Saffah would go on to become the first Abbasid caliph, but he did not come forward to receive the pledge of allegiance from the people until after the Umayyad caliph and a large number of his princes were already killed.

In one far-reaching, historic decision, as-Saffāh established Kufa as the new capital of the caliphate, ending the dominance of Damascus in the Islamic political world, and Iraq would now become the seat of 'Abbassid power for many centuries.

Later tales recount that, concerned that there would be a return of rival Umayyad power, as-Saffāh invited all of the remaining members of the Umayyad family to a dinner party where he had them clubbed to death before the first course, which was then served to the hosts. The only survivor, Abd al-Rahman ibn Mu'awiya, escaped to the province of al-Andalus (Spain), where the Umayyad dynasty would endure for three more centuries in the form of the Emirate of Córdoba and the subsequent Caliphate of Córdoba. Another version is that as-Saffāḥ's new governor to Syria, 'Abd Allāh ibn 'Ali, hunted down the last of the family dynasty, with only Abd al-Rahmān escaping. Ultimately, 'Abbasid rule was accepted even in Syria, and the beginning of the new Islamic dynasty was considered "free from major internal dissensions."

As-Saffāh's four-year reign was marked with efforts to consolidate and rebuild the caliphate. His supporters were represented in the new government, but apart from his policy toward the Umayyad family, as-Saffāh is widely viewed by historians as having been a mild victor. Jews, Nestorian Christians, and Persians were well represented in his government and in succeeding Abbasid administrations. Education was also encouraged, and the first paper mills, staffed by skilled Chinese prisoners captured at the Battle of Talas, were set up in Samarkand.

Equally revolutionary was as-Saffāh's reform of the army, which came to include non-Muslims and non-Arabs in sharp contrast to the Umayyads who refused any soldiers of either type. As-Saffāh selected the gifted Abu Muslim as his military commander, an officer who would serve until 755 in the Abbasid army.

Not all Muslims accept the legitimacy of his caliphate, however. According to later Shi'ites, as-Saffāh turned back on his promises to the partisans of the Alids in claiming the title caliph for himself. The Shi'a had hoped that their imam would be named head of the caliphate, inaugurating the era of peace and prosperity the millennialists had believed would come. The betrayal alienated as-Saffāh's Shi'a supporters, although the continued amity of other groups made Abbasid rule markedly more solvent than that of the Umayyads.

Caliph Abu al-`Abbās `Abdu’llāh as-Saffāḥ died of smallpox on 8 June 754 (13 Dhu al-Hijja 136 AH), only four years after taking the title of caliph. Before he died, as-Saffah appointed his brother Abu Ja'far al-Mansur and, following him, the caliph's nephew Isa ibn Musa as his successors; ibn Musa, however, never filled the position.

Abbasid Military Activities

During his reign a great battle took place in 751 known as the Battle of Talas or Battle of Artlakh was a military engagement between the Abbasid Caliphate along with their ally the Tibetan Empire against the Chinese Tang dynasty. In July 751 AD, Tang and Abbasid forces met in the valley of the Talas River to vie for control over the Syr Darya region of central Asia. After several days of stalemate, the Karluk Turks originally allied to the Tang defected to the Abbasids and tipped the balance of power, resulting in a Tang rout.

The defeat marked the end of Tang westward expansion and resulted in Muslim control of Transoxiana for the next 400 years. Control of this region was economically beneficial for the Abbasids because it was on the Silk Road. Historians debate whether or not Chinese prisoners captured in the aftermath of the battle brought paper-making technology to the Middle East, where it eventually spread to Europe.

The numbers of combatants involved in the Battle of Talas are not known with certainty; however, various estimates exist. The Abbasid army (200,000 Muslim troops according to Chinese estimates, though these numbers may be greatly exaggerated) which included contingents from their Tibetan ally met the combined army of 10,000 Tang Chinese and 20,000 Karluk mercenaries (Arab records put the Chinese forces at 100,000 which also may be greatly exaggerated).

In the month of July 751, the Abbasid forces joined in combat with the Tang Chinese force (the combined army of Tang Chinese and Karluk mercenaries) on the banks of the Talas river.

The Tang army was subjected to a devastating defeat. The Tang dynasty's defeat was due to the defection of Karluk mercenaries and the retreat of Ferghana allies who originally supported the Chinese. The Karluk mercenaries, two-thirds of the Tang army, defected to the Abbasids during the battle; Karluk troops attacked the Tang army from close quarters while the main Abbasid forces attacked from the front. The Tang troops were unable to hold their positions, and the commander of the Tang forces, Gao Xianzhi, recognized that defeat was imminent and managed to escape with some of his Tang regulars with the help of Li Siye. Out of an estimated 10,000 Tang troops, only 2,000 managed to return from Talas to their territory in Central Asia. Despite losing the battle, Li did inflict heavy losses on the pursuing Arab army after being reproached by Duan Xiushi. After the battle, Gao was prepared to organize another Tang army against the Arabs when the devastating An Shi Rebellion broke out in 755. When the Tang capital was taken by rebels, all Chinese armies stationed in Central Asia were ordered back to China proper to crush the rebellion.

Also in 751, the Byzantine Emperor Constantine V led an invasion across the frontier of the Caliphate. The Byzantines captured Theodosiopolis (Erzurum) and Melitene (Malatya), which was demolished. There was no serious attempt to retain control of the captured cities, except for Camachum (modern Kemah, Erzincan), which was garrisoned.

Succession
As-Saffah died after a five-year reign and al-Mansur took on the responsibility of establishing the Abbasid caliphate by holding on to power for nearly 22 years, from Dhu al-Hijjah 136 AH until Dhu al-Hijjah 158 AH (754 – 775). Al-Mansur was proclaimed Caliph on his way to Mecca in the year 753 (136 AH) and was inaugurated the following year. Abu Ja'far Abdallah ibn Muhammad took the name al-Mansur ("the victorious") and agreed to make his nephew Isa ibn Musa his Heir to the Abbasid caliphate. This agreement was supposed to resolve rivalries in the Abbasid family, but al-Mansur's right to accession was particularly challenged by his uncle Abdullah ibn Ali. Once in power, caliph al-Mansur had his uncle imprisoned in 754 and killed in 764.

See also 
 al-Mahdi, nephew and son-in-law of as-Saffah.
 Ubaydallah ibn al-Mahdi an Abbasid Prince and Grandson of as-Saffah.
 Sulayman ibn Ali al-Hashimi an Abbasid governor of Basra from 750 to 755.
 Battle of the Zab a battle that took place on 25 January 750. It spelled the end of the Umayyads and the rise of the Abbasids
 Abbasid Revolution was the overthrow of the Caliph Marwan II by as-Saffah.

References

Bibliography
 Bonner, M.D. (2004) Arab-Byzantine Relations in Early Islamic Times, Ashgate/Variorum, Farnham 
 
 
 
 
 
 
 The Oxford History of Islam, p. 25. Ed. John Esposito. Oxford: Oxford University Press, 1999.

External links

 

   

721 births
754 deaths
Arab Muslims
8th-century Arabs
8th-century rulers in Asia
8th-century rulers in Africa
8th-century rulers in Europe
Deaths from smallpox
8th-century Abbasid caliphs